Chris Tabor (born March 4, 1971) is an American football coach who is the special teams coordinator for the Carolina Panthers of the National Football League (NFL). He previously served as an assistant coach for the Chicago Bears from 2018 to 2021 and the Cleveland Browns from 2011 to 2017 and has more than 20 years of coaching experience between the high school, collegiate and professional levels.

Early life and education
Tabor earned a degree in physical education in 1993 at Benedictine College in Atchison, Kansas, where he was a three-year starter at quarterback for the Benedictine Ravens. He was an all-conference selection and team MVP in 1992, when the Ravens won the Heart of America Athletic Conference (HAAC) championship, and advanced to the NAIA Division II national semifinals. In 2017 Tabor was elected into the Benedictine College Hall of Fame. He earned his master's degree in education in 1999 from Columbia (Mo.) College.

Coaching career

Early career
Tabor started his coaching career in 1993 as an assistant at his alma mater, Benton High School in St. Joseph, Missouri. The following year he coached running backs at Hutchinson Community College in Hutchinson, Kansas before serving as the offensive coordinator at Central Methodist University from 1995 to 1996.

Missouri
In 1997, Tabor was hired by the University of Missouri as a graduate assistant and he would serve in that role for three years before being promoted to their running backs and special teams coach in 2000. While at Columbia, the Tigers ranked in the nation's top 10 in rushing offense and played in two bowl games.

Culver–Stockton College
In 2001, Tabor was hired as the head football coach at Culver–Stockton College in Canton, Missouri, leading the program to a 6–5 record, the school's first winning season in 15 years. In Tabor's only season there, his team set school records for points scored, touchdowns and total yards, and ranked 17th in the NAIA in total defense and 10th in pass defense.

Utah State
In 2002, Tabor joined Utah State University as their assistant head coach and wide receivers coach. In 2005, he served as their running backs and special teams coach.

Western Michigan University
Tabor spent two seasons, 2006 and 2007, at Western Michigan University as the running backs and special teams coach.

Chicago Bears
Tabor got his first shot in the National Football League (NFL) when he spent three seasons (2008–2010) as assistant special teams coach with the Chicago Bears under coordinator Dave Toub on head coach Lovie Smith's staff. During Tabor's tenure with the Bears, Chicago consistently ranked among the league leaders in numerous departments. The Bears ranked in the top five in no less than nine different special teams categories combined over that three-year period. Chicago led the NFL in total return yards (6,570) and kickoff return yards (5,415), posted the second-best kickoff return average (25.1), ranked third in punt return defense (7.1) and produced the fifth-best punt return average (10.4). The Bears also registered six total kick returns for touchdowns in that time, which tied for second-most in the league.

Cleveland Browns
In 2011, Tabor was hired by the Cleveland Browns as their special teams coordinator. During Tabor's tenure in Cleveland, the Browns were the only NFL team to have earned at least one AFC Special Teams Player of the Week award each season from 2011-2016. In total, the Browns won seven AFC Special Teams Player of the Week awards. He also oversaw kicker Phil Dawson and returner Joshua Cribbs in 2012 when were both were selected to the Pro Bowl, marking just the second time in team history that two specialists made the annual all-star game in the same year. Also, during his tenure with the Browns, they lead the NFL in punt return average (11.3 yards), were first in kickoff return average against (19.8) and were tied for sixth in punt return touchdowns (four).

Chicago Bears (second stint)
On January 12, 2018, Tabor was hired by the Chicago Bears as their special teams coordinator under head coach Matt Nagy, reuniting with the team he started his NFL career. 

On October 25, 2021, Nagy tested positive for COVID-19. This resulted in Tabor taking over as the interim head coach and making his NFL head coaching debut in the Bears' Week 8 game against the San Francisco 49ers on October 31, 2021. The Bears lost 33-22 in Tabor's debut.

Carolina Panthers
On January 27, 2022, Tabor was hired by the Carolina Panthers as their special teams coordinator under head coach Matt Rhule.

Personal life
Tabor grew up in a football family, his father, Don, coached high school football in Missouri for 40 years and all of his brothers (Donnie, Matt and Michael) played football at Benedictine College.

Tabor and his wife, Nikki (nee Graves), have two daughters, Paityn and Lainey.

Head coaching record

College

NFL

* Interim head coach

References

External links
 Chicago Bears profile

Living people
Year of birth missing (living people)
American football quarterbacks
Benedictine Ravens football players
Central Methodist Eagles football coaches
Carolina Panthers coaches
Chicago Bears coaches
Cleveland Browns coaches
Culver–Stockton Wildcats football coaches
Hutchinson Blue Dragons football coaches
Missouri Tigers football coaches
Utah State Aggies football coaches
Western Michigan Broncos football coaches
High school football coaches in Missouri
Sportspeople from St. Joseph, Missouri
Coaches of American football from Missouri
Players of American football from Missouri